NGC 6570 is a spiral galaxy in the constellation of Ophiuchus. It is part of the original New General Catalogue.

References

External links

6570
Spiral galaxies
Ophiuchus (constellation)